John Wadsworth (1850 – 10 July 1921) was a British trade unionist and Liberal or Lib-Lab politician.

Born in West Melton in the West Riding of Yorkshire, Wadsworth worked as a coal miner and was elected checkweighman.  He joined the Yorkshire Miners Association, a constituent part of the Miners Federation of Great Britain (MFGB), rising to become the Yorkshire Association's general secretary, then in 1904 its president.

Wadsworth was elected as the Lib-Lab Member of Parliament (MP) for Hallamshire at the 1906 general election.  

In 1909, with the other MFGB-sponsored MPs, he joined the Labour Party, retaining his seat in his new colours.

In 1915 he resigned the Labour whip and re-joined the Liberals. He continued as MP until the seat's abolition for the 1918 general election.

References

Michael Stenton and Stephen Lees, Who's Who of British MPs: Volume II, 1886–1918

External links 

1850 births
1921 deaths
English trade unionists
Labour Party (UK) MPs for English constituencies
Politics of Sheffield
Liberal-Labour (UK) MPs
Liberal Party (UK) MPs for English constituencies
Miners' Federation of Great Britain-sponsored MPs
UK MPs 1906–1910
UK MPs 1910
UK MPs 1910–1918
People from Brampton Bierlow